is a junction passenger railway station located in the city of Ōzu, Ehime Prefecture, Japan. It is operated by JR Shikoku and is the junction of two branches of the Yosan Line and hence has two station numbers "U14" and "S18".

Lines
Iyo-Ōzu is the first station after the junction of two branches of the line, the older Iyonada branch along the coast and the newer, shorter inland Uchiko branch. As such it carries two station number prefixes, the "S" prefix for stations along the Iyonada branch and the "U" prefix used by stations along the Uchiko branch. Local trains serving both branches stop at the station. Connections with other services are needed to travel further east of Matsuyama on the line.

Layout
The station consists of an island platform and a side platform serving three tracks. Access to the island platform is by means of a footbridge. The station building houses a waiting room, a JR ticket window (with a Midori no Madoguchi facility) and a JR Travel Centre (Warp Plaza). Car parking is available at the station. Several sidings branch off the tracks, the one beyond track 3 leading to a disused freight platform.

Adjacent stations

History
After the company was nationalized on 1 October 1933,  Japanese Government Railways (JGR) took over the station. On October 6, 1935, after the track had been re-gauged to 1,067 mm, the station became part of the Yosan Main Line. With the privatization of JNR on 1 April 1987, control of the station passed to JR Shikoku.

Surrounding area
Iyo-Ozu Station Tourist Information Center
Japan National Route 56

See also
 List of railway stations in Japan

References

External links
Iyo-Ōzu Station (JR Shikoku) 

Railway stations in Ehime Prefecture
Railway stations in Japan opened in 1918
Ōzu, Ehime